This is a list of songs that reached No. 1 on the Billboard Japan Digital Track Chart in Japan in 2018.

Chart History

References 

Number-one digital singles of 2018
Japan Digital Singles